Louis Robert Effler was an American ear, nose and throat doctor, popular medical writer and occasional travel writer and local historian.

References

1888 births
1978 deaths
American otolaryngologists
Writers from Toledo, Ohio
20th-century surgeons